Kernu is a village in Saue Parish, Harju County in northern Estonia. It is located in the southwestern part of Harju County and is a neighbour to Saue, Keila, Vasalemma and Nissi Parish in Harju County and Kohila, Rapla and Märjamaa parish in Rapla County.

Before the administrative reform in 2017, the village was in Kernu Parish.

Kernu Manor
Kernu estate was established in 1637. The current building owes its stately neoclassical appearance to a thorough renovation executed 1810–1813, possibly by the designs of renowned Helsinki architect Carl Ludvig Engel.  The front façade is dominated by a richly decorated portico, while the side facing the park displays a 4-column half rotunda, unique in Estonian architecture.

References

External links
Kernu at Estonian Manors Portal

Villages in Harju County
Kreis Harrien
Manor houses in Estonia